French Creek Township, Pennsylvania, can refer to two townships in Pennsylvania
 French Creek Township, Mercer County, Pennsylvania
 Frenchcreek Township, Venango County, Pennsylvania

Pennsylvania township disambiguation pages